Sugarfree is a Filipino rock band currently composed of Jal Taguibao on vocals and bass guitar, and Carlo "Kaka" Quisimbing on drums. Former notable members include chief songwriter and frontman Ebe Dancel on vocals and guitars, and Mitch Singson on drums.

Sugarfree had five albums throughout the course of their career: Sa Wakas (2003), Dramachine (2004) and the repackaged version of Dramachine (2006), Tala-Arawan (2006), Sugarfree Live! with the Manila Symphony Orchestra (2008), and Mornings and Airports (2009), all under PolyEast Records (formerly known as EMI Philippines).
 
After a disbandment in 2011, the band returned as a duo in 2020.

History

Active years (1999–2011)
Sugarfree were a pop-alternative group formed in 1999. Their sound was heavily influenced by the likes of Popsicle, Eraserheads, Oasis, and Radiohead. The initial line up had The Pin-Ups' and Ciudad's Mitch Singson on drums. Singson left the band in August 2006 for personal reasons. Quisumbing immediately took over.

They were signed to Viva Records but their album was shelved. By 2003, with the help of Tracks Studio's Angee Rozul, their first offering was picked up and released by EMI Philippines (now known as PolyEast Records).

Sugarfree have worked with a some of the Philippines' premier record producers such as Angee Rozul and Rico Blanco for Sa Wakas (2003), Buddy Zabala and Raimund Marasigan (members of the  Eraserheads) for Dramachine (2004), Robin Rivera (also an album producer of the Eraserheads) for Tala-Arawan (2006), and Buddy Zabala and "Sancho" Sanchez for "Mornings and Airports" (2009). These albums have produced hit songs. "Hari ng Sablay" and "Makita Kang Muli", in particular, are the songs that brought Sugarfree into mainstream.

In 2007, Sugarfree held their first major concert at Music Museum. They shared the stage with the Manila Symphony Orchestra.

In 2008, Sugarfree created and released the song "Pugad" as endorser of Dencio's, a local restaurant chain. In the same year, Sugarfree revived the song "Bawa't Bata", an APO Hiking Society original, as endorser of the milk brand Alactagrow. The band continue to endorse San Miguel Beer and Converse.

In August 2009, Sugarfree returned to the Music Museum with "Dekada: Sugarfree with the Manila Symphony Orchestra" which was a two-night concert in celebration of the band's 10th anniversary.

In 2010, Sugarfree together with other young musical artists sang ABS-CBN News and Current Affairs MTV for the 2010 Presidential Elections entitled as "Ako ang Simula". At the same time they also sang "Panata Sa Bayan" for the theme of GMA-7 Presidential Elections MTV, 50th Anniversary & its theme song of the GMA News & Public Affairs.

Ebe Dancel also sang the OST for TV5's "8 Kingdom", entitled "Hanggang Sa Dulo".

On March 1, 2011, Sugarfree held their farewell concert called "Paalam Pilipinas" at Eastwood Plaza, Libis, Quezon City.

Post Sugarfree (2011–2020)
After Sugarfree disbanded in 2011, former frontman Ebe Dancel became a solo artist. Dancel sang the song Purihin Ka, as a finalist in the UNTV's 1st Gospel Talent Show, ASOP: A Song Of Praise in 2012. He launched his album "Bawat Daan". Other former members of Sugarfree moved to another band after they disbanded in 2011. 

Jal Taguibao, the band's bassist, moved on from the entertainment industry to academia. He is now assistant professor in the Department of Political Science, College of Social Sciences and Philosophy in the University of the Philippines Diliman. In June 2018, Taguibao received his Doctor of Philosophy (Ph.D.) degree in Political Science from the same university.

Sudden return (2020–present)
On February 25, 2020 the band made a surprise return as a duo of Taguibao and Quisumbing. The band released a new single "Nagkita Muli" on radio station Jam 88.3. In an interview with GMA News Online, Taguibao said they decided to resurrect it because "they missed it". The surprise return was met with mixed reactions, with Ebe's brother musician and lawyer Vin Dancel stating that PolyEast Records owns the exclusive rights to the band's name under the 2002 artist agreement.

Personnel
Current members
 Jal Taguibao – bass guitar, backing vocals (1999–2011, 2020–present); lead vocals (2020–present)
 Kaka Quisumbing – drums (2006–2011, 2020–present)

 Early members
 Ebe Dancel – lead vocals, guitars (1999–2011)
 Mitch Singson – drums (1999–2006)

Discography
Sa Wakas (January 28, 2003)
(Singles : Telepono, Mariposa, Burnout and Taguan)

Sa Wakas (Eng: At Last) was launched at Freedom Bar in 2003.  Sugarfree's first two singles "Telepono" and "Mariposa" became staples on every pop-alternative station in Manila and it wasn't long until they hit the mainstream with the hit song Burnout. Within the same year, Sugarfree won Best New Artist, Album of the Year, and Best Alternative Recording for "Burnout"  at the NU Rock Awards. They also won Best Rock Recording for "Mariposa" at the Awit Awards. The song was inspired by Ebe Dancel's brother, Ian Dancel who is a professor.

Dramachine (February 19, 2004) Repackaged Version released in January 2006
(Singles : Sinta, Hari ng Sablay, Prom, Kwarto, Tulog Na and Makita Kang Muli)

It earned Sugarfree their first platinum record award (signifying over 30,000 copies sold) and made Sugarfree a household name. Dramachine churned out the hits "Sinta", "Prom", "Tulog Na", "Kwarto", and the massive hit "Hari Ng Sablay" (Theme Song of Comedy Movies Hari ng Sablay: Isang Tama, Sampung Mali with MV Appearance Joel Torre). EMI Philippines decided to release a re-packaged Dramachine album bearing additional tracks such as "Cuida" and the anthemic "Makita Kang Muli" (theme song of the TV series Panday). The AVCD also features a collection of the band's music videos.Tala-Arawan (November 24, 2006)
(Singles : Batang Bata Ka Pa, Kung Ayaw Mo Na Sa Akin, Dear Kuya, 'Wag Ka Nang Umiyak (later covered by KZ Tandingan and Gary Valenciano) and Nangangawit)

This album, which means "diary" in English, introduced Kaka Quisumbing as the band's new drummer. The first single "Kung Ayaw Mo Na Sa Akin" was launched simultaneously in more than 40radio stations nationwide. "Tala-Arawan" turned "gold" by April 2008.

SUGARFREE Live! with the Manila Symphony Orchestra (August 2008)

On September 29, 2007, Sugarfree held its first major concert at the Music Museum. This was captured on a two-disc album with the same title, released the following year. The live album (exclusively distributed by Dencio's) comes with a Pugad Dencio's premium AVCD which includes the single Pugad, the Pugad Dencio's jingles edits, and behind-the-scenes footage of the music video and album launch.

Mornings and Airports (July 24, 2009)
(Singles : Hay Buhay, Feels Like and Hang Over)

Their 4th studio album and 5th over-all album was released last July 24, 2009.  Their lead single was Hay Buhay, their 2nd single and 1st English single, Feels Like, followed by their 3rd and last single, Hang Over.  It was the last Sugarfree album before former lead singer Ebe Dancel decided to become a solo artist sometime in March or April 2011.

Studio albums
 Sa Wakas (2003)
 Dramachine (2004)
(Repackaged version released in 2006)
 Tala-Arawan (2006)
 Mornings & Airports (2009)

Live album
SUGARFREE Live! with the Manila Symphony Orchestra (2008)

Compilation albums
Sugarfree's Greatest Hits 2003-2011 (2011)

Collaboration albums
Ultraelectromagnetic Jam (Sony Music Philippines, 2005)
Pinoy Ako! Blue Album (Star Music, 2006)
KaminAPOmuna (Universal Records, Inc., 2006)
Pugad Dencio's (Single, 2008)
I-Star 15: The Best Of Rock & Alternative Songs (Star Music, 2011)
A Perfectly Acoustic Experience (PolyEast Records, 2011)
Awit Kapuso: Kay Sarap Maging Kapuso (GMA Music, 2011)

Notable songs
"Hari Ng Sablay" (used on the film of the same name with actor Joel Torre, one of those who starred in that film appeared on the music video of the song.)
"Tulog Na"
"Mariposa" 
"Wag Ka Nang Umiyak" (covered by KZ Tandingan and now covered by Gary V. as opening theme for TV series FPJ's Ang Probinsyano)
"Makita Kang Muli" (used in ABS-CBN 2's former TV series Ang Panday, now currently used as a 5th theme song from Eat Bulaga!'s Kalyeserye on GMA 7) - also covered by Neocolours was performed on MYX Live in 2012
"Cuida" 
"Kwarto" 
"Kung Ayaw Mo na Sa Akin"
"Dear Kuya" 
"Prom"
"Pugad" 
"Burnout"
"Hay Buhay" 
"Batang Bata Ka Pa" (originally by APO Hiking Society)
"Bawat Bata" (originally by APO Hiking Society)
"Tikman" (originally by Eraserheads)
"Feels Like"
"Walk Slowly"

Music videos
 Burnout (2003)
 Mariposa (2003)
 Sinta (2003)
 Prom (2004)
 Hari ng Sablay (2004)
 Kwarto (2004)
 Tulog Na (2005)
 Makita Kang Muli (2005)
 Dear Kuya (2006)
 Kung Ayaw Mo Na Sa Akin (2006)
 Nangangawit (2006)
 'Wag Ka Nang Umiyak (2007)
 Pugad (2008)
 Hay Buhay (2009)
 Feels Like (2009)
 Hang Over (2010)

Musical 
In 2013, a musical based on Sugarfree songs was shown at the PETA Theater. Titled Sa Wakas: A Pinoy Rock Musical, it was shown to the public from until April 13–28.The music, which featured Sugarfree songs, plus a composition entitled "Bawat Daan" was used for the play. Bawat Daan  later was used by Ebe Dancel for the title and lead single of his album, also of the same name.

Awards and nominations

References

External links
Official website
SUGARFREE on Facebook
SUGARFREE on Twitter
SUGARFREE on Plurk

Filipino rock music groups
Musical groups from Manila
PolyEast Records artists
Musical groups established in 1999
Musical groups disestablished in 2011
1999 establishments in the Philippines